Germanic peoples may refer to:
 Germani, the ancient Germanic tribes of Antiquity and the early medieval times
 present-day speakers of Germanic languages
 Germanic-speaking Europe

It also relates to
 Pan-Germanism
 German nationalism

Language and nationality disambiguation pages